= Sahijadpur =

Sahijadpur is a village in Garwara, Uttar Pradesh, India.
